John B. Yeon State Scenic Corridor is a state park in the U.S. state of Oregon, administered by the Oregon Parks and Recreation Department. It is located about 35 miles east of Portland in the Columbia Gorge. It is named in honor of John B. Yeon, one of the principal financiers of the Historic Columbia River Highway U.S. Route 30 which was constructed between 1913 and 1922. Located in the Columbia River Gorge National Scenic Area, the park features hiking trails that access some of the nearby waterfalls, including Elowah Falls.

See also
 List of Oregon state parks
 Wahe Falls

References

External links
 

State parks of Oregon
Parks in Multnomah County, Oregon